The Year's Best Science Fiction: Twenty-First Annual Collection is a science fiction anthology edited by American writer Gardner Dozois, published in 2004.  It is the 21st in The Year's Best Science Fiction series. The anthology was published in the UK as  The Mammoth Book of Best New Science Fiction 17.

Contents

The book includes a 28-page summation by Dozois; 29 stories, all that first appeared in 2003, and each with a two-paragraph introduction by Dozois; and an eleven-page referenced list of honorable mentions for the year. The stories are as follows:

William Barton: "Off On A Starship"
John Kessel: "It's All True"
Charles Stross: "Rogue Farm"
Steven Popkes: "The Ice"
Nancy Kress: "Ej-Es"
John Varley: "The Bellman"
Judith Moffett: "The Bear's Baby"
Howard Waldrop: "Calling Your Name"
Kristine Kathryn Rusch: "June Sixteenth at Anna's"
Walter Jon Williams: "The Green Leapard Plague"
Paolo Bacigalupi: "The Fluted Girl"
Jack Skillingstead: "Dead Worlds"
Michael Swanwick: "King Dragon"
Paul Melko: "Singletons In Love"
M. Shayne Bell: "Anomalous Structures Of My Dreams"
Vernor Vinge: "The Cookie Monster"
Harry Turtledove: "Joe Steele"
Geoff Ryman: "Birth Days"
John C. Wright: "Awake In the Night"
James Van Pelt: "The Long Way Home"
Geoffrey A. Landis: "The Eyes Of America"
Kage Baker: "Welcome To Olympus, Mr. Hearst"
Robert Reed: "Night Of Time"
William Shunn: "Strong Medicine"
Dominic Green: "Send Me a Mentagram"
Paul Di Filippo: "And the Dish Ran Away With the Spoon"
Terry Dowling: "Flashmen"
Nick DiChario: "Dragonhead"
Terry Bisson: "Dear Abbey"

References

External links
Review and story synopses by Brad Shorr

2004 anthologies
21
St. Martin's Press books